The Survivor Series match is a professional wrestling tag team elimination match held in WWE. The match typically sees two teams pitted against each other and members of the teams are eliminated one-by-one until one entire team is eliminated. Members of the winning team are deemed the "survivors", and in some cases, there may only be one survivor. Although the matches typically see four or five people per team, there have been as many as 10 on a team, and as few as one on a team in a pre-stipulated handicap situation. The match is typically held at WWE's annual Survivor Series pay-per-view and livestreaming event with only the 1998, 2002, and 2022 events not including the namesake match.

Through the 2021 Survivor Series, there have been 89 Survivor Series matches, of which only eight have included women. The shortest match was a 1-versus-4 match which saw Big Show eliminate Big Boss Man, Mideon, Prince Albert, and Viscera in 1:26. The 2016 event saw the only Survivor Series match to last over 50 minutes. While the match typically has two teams against each other, the 2019 event had two Survivor Series matches, one for the men and women each, in which three teams went against each other.

History
In 2001 following WWF's acquisition of World Championship Wrestling, the Survivor Series match featured WWF against The Alliance. During 2003 and 2004 with the WWE brand extension, the event saw each Raw and SmackDown having their own match. In 2005 and 2008, there was only one match which saw Raw against SmackDown. However, 2016, 2017, and 2018 saw the Raw against SmackDown format return, with one men's, one men's tag team (except 2017), and one women's match. The 2019 event introduced three-way Survivor Series matches for both men and women with the addition of the NXT brand (along with its sister brand, NXT UK) in addition to both the Raw and SmackDown brands.

2008 featured the first women's Survivor Series match, since 1995. After several years of no women's Survivor Series matches, in 2013, there was the third woman's match. 2014 featured an additional women's match. Every event since 2016 has featured a women's match.

Matches

See also
 Hell in a Cell
 Royal Rumble match
 Elimination chamber
 Money in the Bank ladder match
 Tables, ladders, and chairs match

References

Survivor Series
WWE match types